WAOX (105.3 FM) is a radio station  broadcasting a hot adult contemporary format. It is licensed to Staunton, Illinois, United States. The station is currently owned by Talley Broadcasting Corporation and features programming from ABC Radio.

History
The station went on the air as WSTN-FM on August 21, 1998. On April 30, 1999, the station changed its call sign to the current WAOX.

References

External links

AOX
Radio stations established in 1998